Halictini is a tribe of sweat bees in the sub-family Halictinae.

Genera
The following are included by BioLib.cz:
 Agapostemon Guérin-Ménéville, 1844
 Agapostemonoides Roberts & Brooks, 1987
 Caenohalictus Cameron, 1903
 Dinagapostemon Moure & Hurd, 1982
 Echthralictus Perkins & Cheesman, 1928
 Eupetersia Blüthgen, 1928
 Glossodialictus Pauly, 1984
 Habralictus Moure, 1941
 Halictus Latreille, 1804
 Homalictus Cockerell, 1919
 Lasioglossum Curtis, 1833
 Mexalictus Eickwort, 1978
 Microsphecodes Eickwort & Stage, 1972
 Nesosphecodes Engel, 2006
 Paragapostemon Vachal, 1903
 Parathrincostoma Blüthgen, 1933
 Patellapis Friese, 1909
 Pseudagapostemon Schrottky, 1909
 Ptilocleptis Michener, 1978
 Rhinetula Friese, 1922
 Ruizantheda Moure, 1964
 Sphecodes Latreille, 1805 (parasitic sweat bees)
 Thrinchostoma Saussure, 1890
 Thrincohalictus Blüthgen, 1955
 Urohalictus Michener, 1980

References

External links
 
 

Halictidae
Hymenoptera tribes